Harford Day School is an independent educational institution in Bel Air, Harford County, Maryland which is known for its dedicated faculty, strong philosophies, impressive academic record, and superior athletic program. Harford Day School is accredited by the Association of Independent Maryland and DC Schools and a member of the National Association of Independent Schools.

The school was founded in 1957 by three women: Sara Brumfield, Sidney Tynan, and Mignon Cameron, the wife of a local judge. The school initially occupied a rented building on Hays Street in Bel Air before moving to its current location on Moores Mill Road in 1962. Harford Day School enrolls boys and girls in grades pre-kindergarten through eight on a  campus in Bel Air, MD. The campus comprises a Lower School building with an attached gymnasium and library, which also houses the school's administrative offices, a Middle School building, a  wing that includes a multi-purpose room and 2 science labs, a Kindergarten building, two playgrounds, three athletic fields, and a small wooded area beside Moores Mill Road.

The school is divided into three divisions: Early Childhood (Little Dragons - K), Lower School (1-5) and Middle School (6-8).

As of the 2020-2021 school year, the Head of School is Mrs. Susan Kearney. The division heads are currently:

 Middle School (Grades 6-8): Mr. Devin Wooten
 Lower School (Grades 1 to 5): Mrs. Ashleigh Wilkes
 Early Childhood (Little Dragons - K): Mrs. Molly Levis

The school teaches Science, Mathematics, History, English grammar and literature, along with three foreign languages. Students are introduced to Spanish and Chinese in pre-kindergarten, and all students take Spanish and Chinese classes through the fourth grade. In fifth grade, students then decide whether to continue with Chinese or Spanish from fifth through eighth grade. A Japanese class is available for eighth graders.  A Latin class is also offered to excelling students in the eighth grade.

Spring Musical
One of the largest events in Harford Day's Middle School is the annual spring musical. The musical became a yearly event in 2000 after a generous contribution to the program by the family of Lyn Stacie Getz '81. An award for outstanding achievement in the performing arts is given in Lyn Stacie Getz's name to an eighth grader at the end of each school year. Each year, the musical has been as follows:

 1995 - The Wizard of Oz
 1996 - Oliver!
 2000 - Annie
 2001 - The Wizard of Oz
 2002 - The Music Man
 2003 - Guys and Dolls
 2004 - Bye Bye Birdie
 2005 - The Sound of Music
 2006 - Aladdin
 2007 - Once Upon a Mattress
 2008 - Fiddler on the Roof
 2009 - The King and I
 2010 - Beauty and the Beast
 2011 - Oklahoma!
 2012 - Annie
 2013 - The Little Mermaid
 2014 - Peter Pan
 2015 - Crazy For You
 2016 - Bye Bye Birdie
 2017 - The Sound of Music
 2018 - Once Upon a Mattress
 2019 - Into the Woods
 2020 - Annie
2021 - Xanadu

External links
 

Bel Air, Harford County, Maryland
Private schools in Harford County, Maryland